Choi Jin-cheul (born 26 March 1971) is a South Korean football manager and former player.

International career
Choi was an influential centre-back in the South Korea national football team. He made 65 appearances for the national team including matches in 2002 and 2006 FIFA World Cup. He formed a strong defense with Hong Myung-bo and Kim Tae-young during the 2002 World Cup.

Personal life
In November 2021, Choi signed with DH Entertainment.

Career statistics

Club

International

Results list South Korea's goal tally first.

Filmography

Television

Honours

Player 
Sangmu FC
Korean Semi-professional League (Spring): 1994

Jeonbuk Hyundai Motors
Korean FA Cup: 2000, 2003, 2005
Korean Super Cup: 2004
AFC Champions League: 2006
Asian Cup Winners' Cup runner-up: 2001–02

South Korea B
East Asian Games: 1993

South Korea
FIFA World Cup fourth place: 2002
EAFF Championship: 2003

Individual
K League 1 Best XI: 2002, 2003, 2006
AFC Champions League Most Valuable Player: 2006

Entertainer

References

External links
 Choi Jin-cheul – National Team Stats at KFA 
 
 
 

1971 births
Living people
South Korean footballers
Association football defenders
South Korea international footballers
South Korean football managers
Jeonbuk Hyundai Motors players
K League 1 players
2002 CONCACAF Gold Cup players
2002 FIFA World Cup players
2004 AFC Asian Cup players
2006 FIFA World Cup players
Pohang Steelers managers
South Korea national under-17 football team managers
People from South Jeolla Province
Jin-cheul